Tapinosteus is an extinct monospecific genus of arthrodire placoderm from the Late Frasnian stage of the Late Devonian period. Fossils are found from Bad Wildungen, Germany.

Phylogeny
Tapinosteus is a basal member of the clade Aspinothoracidi, which belongs to the clade Pachyosteomorphi, one of the two major clades within Eubrachythoraci. The cladogram below shows the phylogeny of Tapinosteus:

References 

Arthrodires